Coeloginanthrin is a phenanthrenoid found in the orchid Coelogyne cristata.

References

External links 
 Coeloginanthrin at kanaya.naist.jp/knapsack_jsp

Phenanthrenoids
Coelogyne
Methoxy compounds